The Ukrainian Third League (Tretia Liha), until 1994 known as the Transitional League, was part of the Ukrainian semi-professional football clubs competitions. In 1994, it was renamed as Third League and granted the status of professionals, but during a winter break of 1995 it was decided to discontinue it and merge back with the Ukrainian Second League.

History
The League as the fourth tier (or third smaller tier) was created after the reorganization once the first championship was completed in 1993. In 1992, original Transitional League was created, which later was transformed into the Ukrainian Second League. The league was created from the pool of clubs of the third tier that did not perform well in the previous season as well as the best new amateur clubs that had won their respective regional competitions.

Throughout its history the League yielded at least four promotions each year. That in turn fueled the rise of the Ukrainian new football clubs, FC Arsenal Kyiv and FC Metalurh Donetsk. At the end of the 1995 season, the League was incorporated back into the Second League and the teams of both Leagues were then split into two groups.

Each season the league was admitting about 10 new clubs from the KFK competitions (8 in 1993, 10 in 1994, and 12 in 1995).

In 1992–93 Ukrainian Transitional League took place several strange nuances. The third placed team withdrew after being granted promotion, the fourth place which in mid-season was forcefully merged with another entity gave away its promotion in favor of the newly acquired entity, another club which was excluded from competitions due to sportsmanship conduct sanctions was reinstated for the next season, out of the last six team, the third from the bottom of the season's standing table was allowed to stay for the next season.

Third League winners

All-time table
Top-20. All names are shown as at the time of the last participation.

Notes

Note: Teams in bold earned promotion.

References

 
4
Third
Sports leagues established in 1992
1992 establishments in Ukraine
Sports leagues disestablished in 1995
1995 disestablishments in Ukraine
Defunct fourth level football leagues in Europe